Henry Johnston was an English professional footballer who played as an inside forward.

Career
Johnston joined Port Vale on amateur terms from Manchester Amateur League football in 1920. He joined Grimsby Town in December 1920, and played one Third Division South match against Gillingham on 2 April 1921.

Career statistics
Source:

References

Footballers from Manchester
English footballers
Association football inside forwards
Port Vale F.C. players
Grimsby Town F.C. players
English Football League players